Kellevie is a rural locality in the local government area (LGA) of Sorell in the South-east LGA region of Tasmania. The 2016 census has a population of 164 for the state suburb of Kellevie.

History 
Kellevie was gazetted as a locality in 1972.

Upper Carlton Post Office opened on 1 January 1874, was renamed Kellevie in 1886 and closed in 1968.

Geography
The Carlton River flows through from north-west to south.

Road infrastructure 
Route C335 (Kellevie Road) enters from the south and runs through to the north-west, where it exits. Route C336 (Bream Creek Road) starts at an intersection with Route C335 and runs north-east until it exits.

References

Towns in Tasmania
Southern Tasmania
Localities of Sorell Council